The 1910 Kansas Jayhawks football team was an American football team that represented the University of Kansas as a member of the Missouri Valley Conference (MVC) during the 1910 college football season. In their seventh and final season under head coach A. R. Kennedy, the Jayhawks compiled a 6–1–1 record (1–1–1 against conference opponents), finished in fifth place in the conference, and outscored opponents by a total of 75 to 22. The Jayhawks played their home games at McCook Field in Lawrence, Kansas. Tommy Johnson was the team captain.

Schedule

References

Kansas
Kansas Jayhawks football seasons
Kansas Jayhawks football